Dorcadion kozanii is a species of beetle in the family Cerambycidae. It was described by Breuning in 1962.

References

kozanii
Beetles described in 1962